Daws may refer to:

Daws (name)
Daws Heath, woodland in Essex, England
Daws Road, Adelaide, Australia
Banu Daws, one of the tribes of Arabia during Muhammad's era

See also

 Daw (disambiguation)
 Dawes (disambiguation)
 RAF Daws Hill, a closed Royal Air Force base
 Daw's Castle, Watchet, Somerset, England